Glen Joseph Ella (born 5 June 1959) is a former Australian rugby union player and coach. Ella played as a Fullback for Randwick, Manly and New South Wales. Ella also represented Australia in the 1980s, however, did not play at the first Rugby World Cup in the 1987 Rugby World Cup.

Biography

Born in La Perouse, New South Wales, Ella was one of 12 children. Two of his brothers, Mark (his twin) and Gary, and one of his sisters, Marcia, represented Australia in sports - his brothers in rugby union and his sister in netball. He attended school at Matraville High School.

Playing career

Ella took up playing at Matraville High School, soon representing New South Wales in schoolboy rugby.

He made his test debut for Australia in a 7–12 loss against Scotland at Ballymore Stadium in 1982, starting at fullback. He played his second test for the Wallabies against Italy in 1983 in Rovigo, winning 7–29. Ella played his last two games for Australia in 1985 against Canada and Fiji respectively. Both matches Australia won convincingly.

Coaching career

Glen Ella was Wallabies assistant coach during the 1995 Rugby World Cup in South Africa. Ella moved with his family to England and he coached Stourbridge for six months. He was a technical adviser to the Brumbies and also coached the Australian Sevens.

According to ESPN, "He also served as Wallabies assistant coach under Eddie Jones and took on a similar role with Canada ahead of their 2007 Rugby World Cup campaign. In 2009 he was appointed to a four-man Fiji Rugby Union selection panel."

In 2016, he was the backs' coach for the England team that toured Australia under coach Eddie Jones.

References

People educated at Matraville Sports High School
Australian rugby union coaches
Australian rugby union players
Australia international rugby union players
Indigenous Australian rugby union players
Rugby union fullbacks
1959 births
Living people
Rugby union players from Sydney